Highcastle may refer to:
Highcastle: A Remembrance, a 1966 coming-of-age autobiographical novel by  Stanisław Lem
Lord Augustus Highcastle, the protagonist of Augustus Does His Bit, a 1916 comic play by  George Bernard Shaw
Highcastle, a fictional frontier fort town in novel A Darkness at Sethanon by  Raymond E. Feist and in the video game Betrayal at Krondor based on it
Highcastle Public School, an elementary school in the Toronto District School Board, Canada